The Alpino class were a group of two frigates built for the Italian Navy during the Cold War.

Design 
The design was originally conceived as an enlarged version of the s. The design was however changed radically with a CODAG machinery suite comprising gas turbines and diesels. These ships introduced the use of ship-based helicopters and variable depth sonar into the Italian Navy.

The ships underwent significant modernisation in the 1980s with the fitting of new sonar and electronic warfare equipment.

Ships 
Initially four ships were planned to be ordered in 1959 to 1961. These ships were to be named Circe, Climene, Perseo and Polluce in honour of the World War II-era s of those names. These ships were postponed while the designs were updated and two ships were ordered in 1962. Both vessels were built by CNR in Riva Trigoso and named after types of soldiers and specifically after two World War II s.

The ships were used as auxiliary vessels from the mid-1990s. Carabiniere was used as a trials ship for new missiles (PAAMS) and radar.

Citations

Sources 
 Blackman, Raymond V.B. Jane's Fighting Ships 1971–72. London: Sampson Low, Marston & Co., Ltd, 1971. .
 Gardiner, Roger and Stephen Chumbley. Conway's All the World's Fighting Ships 1947–1995. Annapolis, Maryland, USA, 1995. .
 Moore, John. Jane's Fighting Ships 1985–86. London: Jane's Yearbooks, 1985. .

External links 
 Alpino (F 580 – A5384) Marina Militare website
 Carabiniere (F 581) Marina Militare website

 
Frigate classes